Rosenberg, Rosenburg or Rozenburg may refer to:

Places 
 Rosenberg (Baden), a municipality in the district of Neckar-Odenwald, Baden-Württemberg, Germany 
 Rosenberg (Ostalb), a municipality in the district of Ostalbkreis, Baden-Württemberg, Germany 
 Rosenburg (Winterthur), a quarter in Switzerland 
 Sulzbach-Rosenberg in the district of Amberg-Sulzbach, Bavaria, Germany
 Rosenborg, Trondheim, a neighbourhood in Trondheim, Norway
 Rosenburg, Nebraska, an unincorporated community in the U.S.
 Rosenberg, Texas, Fort Bend County, USA
 Rosenburg-Mold, a town in the district of Horn, Austria
 Rosenburg, a castle in the town
 Rozenburg (island), Netherlands
 Rozenburg, a town and submunicipality
 the German names for:
 Susz, in Poland (Rosenberg in Westpreußen, West Prussia)
 Olesno, in Poland (Upper Silesia)
 Ružomberok, in Slovakia
 Rožmberk nad Vltavou with Rožmberk Castle in the Czech Republic
 Rosenberg Glacier, a glacier in Antarctica

People 
 Rosenberg (surname), includes Rozenburg

See also 
 Rosenberg Trio, a musical group
 Rosenberg's Department Store, a historic building in Santa Rosa, California
 Rosenberg Brothers Department Store, a historic building in Albany, Georgia, United States
 Rosenberger (disambiguation)
 Rosemont (disambiguation), the French analogue corresponding to rose + hill/mountain